Agibalov (masculine) or Agibalova (feminine) is a Russian last name. Variants of this surname include Ogibalov/Ogibalova (/) and  Ogibenin/Ogibenina (/).

All these surnames derive from the nicknames "" (Ogibalo) - or "" (Agibalo) in dialects with akanye - and "" (Ogibenya). The nicknames were in turn derived from the dialectal words "", meaning a sycophant, a flatterer, a trickster, and "", meaning to deceive, to swindle. The following people bear this surname:
Irina Agibalova, a contestant on Dom-2, a Russian reality TV show
V. I. Agibalov, one of the designers of the statue to Vladimir Lenin in Vynnitsia, Ukraine

See also
Agibalovo, several rural localities in Russia
Ogibalovo, several rural localities in Russia

References

Notes

Sources
И. М. Ганжина (I. M. Ganzhina). "Словарь современных русских фамилий" (Dictionary of Modern Russian Last Names). Москва, 2001. 



Russian-language surnames